Cyperus simpsonii is a species of sedge that is native to parts of Africa.

See also 
 List of Cyperus species

References 

simpsonii
Plants described in 2011
Flora of Zambia
Flora of Tanzania
Flora of the Democratic Republic of the Congo